Swallow is a family of birds.

Swallow or Swallows may also refer to:
 Swallowing, transferring a substance from the mouth to the stomach

Music
 Swallow (British band), a 1990s duo
 Swallow (American band), a 1970s blues rock band or their 1973 album
 The Swallows, a 1950s R&B group
 La rondine or The Swallow, an opera by Giacomo Puccini
 Swallow Records, a record label formed by Floyd Soileau

Albums
 Swallow (Steve Swallow album)
 Swallow (Zhao Wei album)

Songs
 "Swallow" (song), a song by Sleeper
 "The Swallow" (Yoasobi song), a song by Yoasobi
 "Swallow", a song by Emilie Autumn from Opheliac
 "Swallow", a song by Crystal Fighters from Follow / Swallow
 "Swallow", a song by Korn from Life Is Peachy

Sports
 Dingli Swallows F.C., a Maltese football club
 Mbabane Swallows, a Swazi football club
 Moroka Swallows FC, a South African football club
 Tokyo Yakult Swallows, a Japanese baseball team
 Estonia men's national ice hockey team or the Swallows

Transport
 Swallow Sidecar Company
 Swallow, a GWR Iron Duke Class locomotive
 Swallow, a GWR 3031 Class Great Western Railway locomotive
 Swallow, an RB545 rocket engine

Aeronautics 
 British Aircraft Swallow, a 1930s light aircraft
 De Havilland DH 108 Swallow, an experimental British aircraft designed in 1945
 Fly Air Swallow, a Bulgarian ultralight trike design
 Messerschmitt Me 262 Schwalbe or Swallow, a World War II German fighter aircraft
 Republic SD-4 Swallow, a 1960 American drone project
 Swallow Airplane Company, an American aviation company in operation 1923-1956
 Swallow, an experimental jet aircraft design by Barnes Wallis

Ships
 , several ships of the Royal Navy
 , several ships
 , several ships of the United States Navy
 , several ships
 Swallow (keelboat), a class of sailboats, used at the 1948 Olympics

Other uses
 Swallow (surname)
 Swallow (2019 film), American–French drama
Swallow (2021 film), Nigerian film
 Swallow (hieroglyph)
 Swallow (novel), 1899, by H. Rider Haggard
 Swallow, Lincolnshire, England
 Swallows, Colorado, a ghost town in the United States
 Swallow Hotels
 Swallow (food), dough-like African staple food made of cooked starchy vegetables and/or grains

See also
 De Zwaluw (disambiguation)
 Swallow Falls
 Swallow Reef
 Swallow tattoo